Stabæk Bandy is the bandy section of Stabæk IF, a Norwegian sports club from Stabekk/Bekkestua in Bærum, founded in 1912.

They are a domestically successful club. However, they have failed to make a big impact in the Bandy World Cup.

Squad
As of 20.10.2021 Tropp A-laget 2021-2022:

External links
ibdb bandysidan
Official website

Bandy clubs in Norway
Bandy
Bandy clubs established in 1912